The Adventures of Nicholas Nickleby (Italian: Le avventure di Nicola Nickleby) is an Italian television series which first aired on RAI 1 in 1958. It is based on the novel Nicholas Nickleby by Charles Dickens.

Main cast
 Antonio Cifariello as Nicola Nickleby (6 episodes)
 Leonora Ruffo as Caterina Nickleby (6 episodes)
 Elisa Cegani as Signorina La Creevy 6 episodes)
 Evi Maltagliati as Signora Nickleby (6 episodes)
 Carlo D'Angelo	as Newman Noggs (6 episodes) 
 Aroldo Tieri as Wackford Squeers (6 episodes) 
 Enrico Glori as Arturo Gride (6 episodes)
 Maria Grazia Spina as Maddalena Bray (6 episodes)
 Arnoldo Foà as  Rodolfo Nickleby (5 episodes)
 Alberto Lupo as Walter Bray (5 episodes)

References

External links
 

1958 Italian television series debuts
1958 television series endings
1950s Italian television series
Italian-language television shows
Television series set in the 19th century
RAI original programming
Television shows based on works by Charles Dickens